Douglas Highway may refer to:
Douglas Highway (Alaska), a road that traverses the eastern and northern shores of Douglas Island
Douglas Highway (Georgia), a road located in south-central Georgia
Douglas Highway (Wyoming), a road located in northeastern Wyoming
Point Douglas to Superior Military Road, a historical road in Minnesota and Wisconsin known as the "Douglas Highway"